Colourful Pages (Swedish: Brokiga blad) is a 1931 Swedish musical comedy film directed by Edvin Adolphson, Valdemar Dalquist and starring Adolphson, Lili Ziedner, Gösta Ekman and Dagmar Ebbesen. It has described as the first Swedish revue film. It was shot at the Råsunda Studios in Stockholm and on location around the city. The film's sets were designed by the art directors Vilhelm Bryde and Arne Åkermark.

Cast
 Edvin Adolphson as 	Movie director
 Lili Ziedner as 	The Queen
 Gösta Ekman as 	Sigge Wulff
 Vera Nilsson as 	Daughter
 Håkan Westergren as 	Neighbour's boy
 Dagmar Ebbesen as 	Mrs. Ebbesen
 Sigurd Wallén as 	Strandcharmören
 Nils Lundell as Father
 Concordia Selander as 	Grandmother
 Valdemar Dalquist as Valdemar Dalquist
 Arvid Petersén as 	Singer
 Olga Adamsén as 	Woman at cocktail party 
 Albin Ahrenberg as Pilot 
 Helge Andersson as Janitor at the exhibition 
 Anna-Lisa Baude as 	Girl 
 Eric Bengtson as Orchestra manager 
 Stina Berg as 	Mother Stina 
 Erik Bergvall as Bergvall 
 Gösta Bodin as Opera singer 
 Rulle Bohman as 	Rulle from Gothenburg 
 Arne Borg as 	Self - the swimmer 
 Ernst Brunman as 	Man falling into the water 
 Vilhelm Bryde as 	Production manager 
 Oscar Carlsson as Make-up artist 
 Gucken Cederborg as 	Opera singer 
 Gustaf Edgren as 	Edgren, director 
 Carl Gustaf Ekman as Prime minister Ekman 
 Annalisa Ericson as 	Dancer 
 Emanuel Gille as 	Film crew 
 Isaac Grünewald as Isaac, the painter 
 Eric Gustafson as 	Guest at restaurant 
 Gösta Gustafson as 	Manager at shopping department 
 Weyler Hildebrand as 	Janitor at the exhibition 
 Gösta Jonsson as 	Accordion player 
 Helge Kihlberg as Guest at restaurant 
 Thyra Leijman-Uppström as Woman at cocktail party 
 Mats Lindberg as 	Lindberg 
 Sigfrid Lindberg as 	Soccer player 
 Richard Lindström as Scotsman 
 Manne Lundh as 	Make-up artist 
 Hugo Lundström as 	Man in sightseeing bus 
 John Melin as 	Wholesalesman in the boat 
 Gustaf Molander as Molander, director 
 John Nilsson as 	Soccer player 
 Katie Rolfsen as Bathing beauty 
 Edla Rothgardt as 	Woman at cocktail party 
 Victor Sjöström as Sjöström, director
 Greta Strömberg as 	Twin #1 
 Maya Strömberg as 	Twin #2 
 Palle Östling as Banjo player

References

Bibliography 
 Qvist, Per Olov & von Bagh, Peter. Guide to the Cinema of Sweden and Finland. Greenwood Publishing Group, 2000.
 Wallengren, Ann-Kristin.  Welcome Home Mr Swanson: Swedish Emigrants and Swedishness on Film. Nordic Academic Press, 2014.

External links 
 

1931 films
Swedish comedy films
1931 comedy films
1930s Swedish-language films
Films directed by Edvin Adolphson
Swedish black-and-white films
1930s Swedish films